Synallaxis is a genus of birds in the ovenbird family, Furnariidae. It is one of the most diverse genera in the family and is composed of small birds that inhabit dense undergrowth across tropical and subtropical habitats in the Neotropical region. Some species show contrasting plumage patterns involving rufous crown and wing patches and black throat patches but they are difficult to see as they keep ensconced in vegetation most of the time. Most species show the long graduated tail with pointy feathers that is typical of spinetails. They are also characterized by constructing large domed nests with stick, including a long entrance tube. Some species can be difficult to distinguish from one another on the basis of their plumage, but can be tell apart by their vocalizations, which can be quite distinctive.

Taxonomy

The genus Synallaxis was introduced in 1818 by the French ornithologist Louis Jean Pierre Vieillot. The name is from the Ancient Greek sunallaxis meaning "exchange". Vieillot did not specify a type species but in 1840 George Gray designated the rufous-capped spinetail.

The genus contains 36 species:

Ochre-cheeked spinetail (Synallaxis scutata)
Grey-bellied spinetail (Synallaxis cinerascens)
Plain-crowned spinetail (Synallaxis gujanensis)
White-lored spinetail (Synallaxis albilora)
Marañón spinetail (Synallaxis maranonica)
Great spinetail (Synallaxis hypochondriaca)
Chinchipe spinetail (Synallaxis chinchipensis)
Necklaced spinetail (Synallaxis stictothorax)
Russet-bellied spinetail (Synallaxis zimmeri)
Slaty spinetail (Synallaxis brachyura)
Silvery-throated spinetail (Synallaxis subpudica)
Red-shouldered spinetail (Synallaxis hellmayri)
Rufous-capped spinetail (Synallaxis ruficapilla)
Bahia spinetail (Synallaxis cinerea)
Pinto's spinetail (Synallaxis infuscata)
Dusky spinetail (Synallaxis moesta)
McConnell's spinetail (Synallaxis macconnelli)
Cabanis's spinetail (Synallaxis cabanisi)
Cinereous-breasted spinetail (Synallaxis hypospodia)
Spix's spinetail (Synallaxis spixi)
Dark-breasted spinetail (Synallaxis albigularis)
Río Orinoco spinetail (Synallaxis beverlyae)
Pale-breasted spinetail (Synallaxis albescens)
Sooty-fronted spinetail (Synallaxis frontalis)
Azara's spinetail (Synallaxis azarae)
Apurímac spinetail (Synallaxis courseni)
White-whiskered spinetail (Synallaxis candei)
Rufous-breasted spinetail (Synallaxis erythrothorax)
Hoary-throated spinetail (Synallaxis kollari)
Blackish-headed spinetail (Synallaxis tithys)
Rusty-headed spinetail (Synallaxis fuscorufa)
Rufous spinetail (Synallaxis unirufa)
Black-throated spinetail (Synallaxis castanea)
Stripe-breasted spinetail (Synallaxis cinnamomea)
Ruddy spinetail (Synallaxis rutilans)
Chestnut-throated spinetail (Synallaxis cherriei)

Formerly, some authorities also considered the following species as species within the genus Synallaxis:
White-browed spinetail (as Synallaxis gularis)
Chotoy spinetail (as Synallaxis phryganophila)
White-bellied spinetail (as Synallaxis propinqua)

References

External links

Synallaxis. Integrated Taxonomic Information System (ITIS).
Synallaxis species. BirdLife International.

 
Bird genera
Taxa named by Louis Jean Pierre Vieillot